4-Fluoroethylphenidate (4F-EPH) is a recreational designer drug from the phenidate family, with stimulant effects. It was first identified in France in March 2016. It has been used as a nootropic drug, and was made illegal in the UK in 2017, and in Sweden in 2018.

See also 
 4-Fluoromethylphenidate
 Ethylphenidate

References 

2-Benzylpiperidines
Carboxylate esters
Designer drugs
Ethyl esters
Norepinephrine–dopamine reuptake inhibitors
Stimulants
2-Piperidinyl compounds